Loop unswitching is a compiler optimization. It moves a conditional inside a loop outside of it by duplicating the loop's body, and placing a version of it inside each of the if and else clauses of the conditional. This can improve the parallelization of the loop. Since modern processors can operate quickly on vectors, this improvement increases the speed of the program.

Here is a simple example. Suppose we want to add the two arrays x and y and also do something depending on the variable w.  We have the following C code:

  int i, w, x[1000], y[1000];
  for (i = 0; i < 1000; i++) {
    x[i] += y[i];
    if (w)
      y[i] = 0;
  }

The conditional inside this loop makes it difficult to safely parallelize this loop. When we unswitch the loop, this becomes:

  int i, w, x[1000], y[1000];
  if (w) {
    for (i = 0; i < 1000; i++) {
      x[i] += y[i];
      y[i] = 0;
    }
  } else {
    for (i = 0; i < 1000; i++) {
      x[i] += y[i];
    }
  }

While the loop unswitching may double the amount of code written, each of these new loops may now be separately optimized.

Loop unswitching was introduced in gcc in version 3.4.

References

Compiler optimizations